The Critérium International d'Alger is a one-day cycling race held annually in Algeria. It is part of UCI Africa Tour in category 1.2.

Winners

References

Cycle races in Algeria
2014 establishments in Algeria
UCI Africa Tour races
Recurring sporting events established in 2014